Kirk is a given name. Notable people with the name include:
Arts
Kirk Covington, American musician

 Kirk Docker, co-creator of Australian TV series You Can't Ask That
Kirk Franklin (1970– ), American gospel musician
Kirk Hammett (1962– ), American musician, lead guitarist of Metallica
Kirk Jarvinen (1967–), American artist
Kirk Joseph (1961–), American musician
Kirk Kelly (c. 1960–), American singer
Kirk Lightsey (1937–), American pianist
Kirk Mitchell (1950–), American author
Kirk Pengilly (1958– ), Australian musician
Kirk Powers (1957– ), American musician
Kirk Whalum (1958– ), American saxophonist
Kirk Windstein (1965– ), American musician

Athletics
Kirk Baptiste (1963– ), American Olympics athlete
Kirk Barton (1984– ), American football player
Kirk Baumgartner (1967– ), American football player
Kirk Bowman (1952– ), Canadian ice hockey player
Kirk Broadfoot (1984– ), Scottish footballer
Kirk Bullinger (1969– ), American baseball player
Kirk Chambers (1979– ), American football player
Kirk Cousins (1988– ), American football player
Kirk Dixon (1984– ), English rugby player
Kirk Dressendorfer (1969– ), American baseball player
Kirk Earlywine (1964– ), American basketball coach
Kirk Edwards (1984– ), Barbadian cricketer
Kirk Ferentz (1955– ), American football coach
Kirk Furey (1976– ), Canadian ice hockey player
Kirk Gibson (1957– ), American baseball player
Kirk Hanefeld (1956– ), American golfer
Kirk Haston (1979– ), American basketball player
Kirk Herbstreit (1969– ), American sportscaster
Kirk Hilton (1981– ), English footballer
Kirk Hinrich (1981– ), American basketball player
Kirk Hudson (1986– ), English footballer
Kirk Hunter (1963– ), Northern Irish footballer
Kirk Jackson (1976– ), English footballer
Kirk Johnson (1972– ), Canadian boxer
Kirk Lowdermilk (1963– ), American football player
Kirk Maltby (1972– ), Canadian ice hockey player
Kirk McCarthy (1966–2004), Australian motorcycle racer
Kirk McCaskill (1961– ), Canadian baseball player
Kirk McLean (1966– ), Canadian ice hockey player
Kirk Merritt (born 1997), American football player
Kirk Morrison (1972– ), American football player
Kirk Morrison (poker player), American poker player
Kirk Muller (1966– ), Canadian ice hockey player
Kirk Netherton (1985– ), English rugby player
Kirk Nielsen (1973– ), American ice hockey player
Kirk O'Bee (1977– ), American cyclist
Kirk Olivadotti (1974– ), American football coach
Kirk Palmer (1986– ), Australian Olympics swimmer
Kirk Penney (1980– ), New Zealand basketball player
Kirk Powell (1972– ), Jamaican cricketer
Kirk Radomski (1969– ), American figure in the baseball steroids scandal
Kirk Reynoldson (1979– ), Australian rugby player
Kirk Rueter (1970– ), American baseball player
Kirk Saarloos (1979– ), American baseball player
Kirk Scrafford (1967– ), American football player
Kirk Shelmerdine (1958– ), American race car driver
Kirk Yeaman (1983– ), English rugby player

Entertainment
Kirk Acevedo (1974– ), American actor
Kirk Alyn (1910–1999), American actor
Kirk Baily (1963–2022), American actor
Kirk Baltz (1959– ), American actor
Kirk Baxter (1972– ), Australian film editor
Kirk Brandon (1956– ), English musician
Kirk Browning (1921–2008), American television executive
Kirk Cameron (1970– ), American actor
Kirk DeMicco (1969– ), American screenwriter
Kirk Degiorgio, British DJ
Kirk Demorest, American filmmaker
Kirk Douglas (1916–2020), American actor
Kirk Fogg (1959– ), American actor
Kirk Francis (1947– ), American film sound mixer
Kirk Harris, American actor
Kirk Thornton (1956– ), American voice actor
Kirk B. R. Woller (1962– ), American actor

Finance
Kirk Boott (1791–1837), American industrialist
Kirk Kerkorian (1917–2015), American businessman

Law
Kirk Anderson (judge) (fl. 2000s), Jamaican judge
Kirk Bloodsworth (1960– ), American advocate for justice reform
Kirk Cashmere (1955–2004), American lawyer

Military
Kirk Lippold, American naval officer

Politics
Kirk Cox (1957– ), American politician
Kirk Dawes (1958– ), British mediator
Kirk Fordham (1967– ), American Congressional aide
Kirk Fordice (1934–2004), American politician, governor of Mississippi
Kirk Humphreys (1950– ), American politician
Kirk MacDonald, Canadian politician
Kirk Schuring (1952– ), American politician
Kirk Talbot (1969– ), Louisiana politician

Science
Kirk Bryan (geologist) (1888–1950), American geologist
Kirk Bryan (oceanographer) (1929– ), American oceanographer

Others
Kirk Hyslop (1889–?), Canadian architect
Kirk Lankford (1985– ), American murderer
Kirk Martinez, English academic
Kirk Schulz, president of Kansas State University
Kirk White, Pagan lecturer and author

Fictional characters
Kirk Anderson (As the World Turns), fictional character on the soap opera As the World TurnsKirk Cranston (Santa Barbara), fictional character on the soap opera Santa BarbaraKirk Gleason, a character from the hit WB show Gilmore GirlsKirk Lazarus, fictional character from Tropic ThunderKirk Sutherland, fictional character in British TV series Coronation StreetKirk Van Houten, fictional character from The Simpsons''

As a middle name
Michael Kirk Douglas (born 1944), American actor
Marshall Kirk McKusick (born 1954), (computer scientist)

See also
Kirk
Kirk (disambiguation)
Kirk (surname)
Kirk as a placename element

Scottish masculine given names
English masculine given names